Belenikhino is a rural locality (a selo) and the administrative center of Belenikhinskoye Rural Settlement, Prokhorovsky District, Belgorod Oblast, Russia. The population was 1,183 as of 2010. There are 30 streets.

Geography 
Belenikhino is located 17 km southwest of Prokhorovka (the district's administrative centre) by road. Ivanovka is the nearest rural locality.

References 

Rural localities in Prokhorovsky District